The United Arab Republic women's national basketball team or in (Arabic: منتخب الجمهورية العربية المتحدة للسيدات لكرة السلة) was a historical women's national basketball team that existed between the year 1958–1971 that has represented the United Arab Republic which was a union between Egypt (including the occupied Gaza Strip) and Syria.

History
The United Arab Republic women's national basketball team has since the foundation back in 1958 won two African Championships from 3 appearances but has no appearances of World Championship nor in the Olympics.

Performance table

FIBA Africa ChampionshipAfrican basketball competitions Retrieved 5 September 2021

African Games

References

External links
Official website
FIBA profile
AfroBasket: Egyptian women's national team
Egyptian basketball records at FIBA Archive

Women's national basketball teams